Sabotage is a 1939 American action film directed by Harold Young and written by Lionel Houser and Alice Altschuler. The film stars Arleen Whelan, Gordon Oliver, Charley Grapewin, Lucien Littlefield, Paul Guilfoyle and J. M. Kerrigan. The film was released on October 13, 1939, by Republic Pictures.

Plot

Cast
Arleen Whelan as Gail
Gordon Oliver as Tommy Grayson
Charley Grapewin as Major Matt Grayson
Lucien Littlefield as Eli
Paul Guilfoyle as Steve Barsht
J. M. Kerrigan as Mel
Dorothy Peterson as Edith Grayson
Don Douglas as Joe Grayson
Joe Sawyer as Gardner
Maude Eburne as Mrs. Hopkins
Horace McMahon as Art Kruger
Johnny Russell as Matt Grayson II
Wade Boteler as Cop
Frank Darien as Smitty

References

External links
 

1939 films
American action films
1930s action films
Republic Pictures films
American black-and-white films
1930s English-language films
Films directed by Harold Young (director)
1930s American films
English-language action films